Viavii is an online community marketplace that allows people to explore, book and host in-person and online experiences from all around the world. The experiential travel platform offers experiences and itineraries that are adjustable on-the-move, while connecting users with residents of their destination at any time. Based in Amman, Jordan, Viavii also has offices in Qatar.

Viavii is a Google start-up that uses technologies such as artificial intelligence and machine learning for a personalised user experience. The platform can be accessed via website and will soon be available as an application for android and IOS. Users can set up an account to either host or book experiences. Viavii only receives commission from each experience sold as it does not own any of the experiences listed on the website.

History 
The company was founded in 2016 by Rola Fayyad under the name “friendture", with the initial idea of creating a mobile application for group travellers and friends to plan and organise their trips together. Due to the change in consumer behaviour, Viavii was launched in January 2019, to enable travellers to explore new places and cultures while connecting with locals and likeminded people. 

As part of their corporate social responsibility and social impact, they connect local communities who often lack an online presence with travellers who are looking for immersive local-led activities. In 2019, they started a social project called ViaVii Locals that aims to encourage and support entrepreneurs (particularly women and youth) to build sustainable tourism businesses in rural communities. By 2020, the company had obtained an “undisclosed amount” of seed money, and it has been shared that Tech Venture Fund by QSTP is a lead investor.

ViaVii has been cited as an “innovative example of the role and impact of the sharing economy era on authentic sustainable tourism” .

Online experiences 
Viavii launched the feature online experiences and entered the market of fully digitised experiences in 2020 as a response to the COVID-19 pandemic. Online experiences are considered an alternative to travel, as they entertain people quarantining at home, while also posing an opportunity for service providers to still make money despite travel restrictions.

2022 FIFA World Cup 
Viavii was one of the ten winners of challenge 22, the Supreme Committee for Delivery & Legacy’s flagship innovation programme. The competition provides an opportunity for participants in the Arab region to display their innovative start-ups, and target the football fans and visitors who will be attending the 2022 FIFA world cup in Qatar.

Viavii is expected to provide its services to the fans during the 2022 world cup. An AI-based itinerary planner powered by Viavii is scheduled to be integrated into Qatar’s most prominent websites to help newcomers and residents navigate exploring Qatar.  As they highlight the region’s culture, their focus will also be contributing to a digitised and more innovative future for tourism.

Locations 
Viavii operates in the following locations worldwide:

Africa
Egypt: Cairo

Kenya: Limuru, Masaai, Mombasa, Nakuru, Nairobi

 Morocco: Agadir, Casablanca, Marrakech, Merzouga, Ouzoud

Asia
India: Agra, Mumbai, New Delhi 

Indonesia: Bali

 Jordan: Ajloun, Amman, Aqaba, As-salt, Al-Karak, Balqa, Beidha, Bussiara, Humaima, Irbid, Jerash, Northern Valley, Pella, Petra, Shobak, Tafilah, Umm Qais, Wadi araba, Wadi Rum

Lebanon: Beirut

Oman: Muscat, Salalah

Qatar: Al Khor, Al Wakrah, Al-Shahaniya, Doha, Mesaieed

Saudi Arabia: Abha, An nafud, Alula, Hail city, Jazan, Jeddah, King Abdullah Economic City, Neom, Riyadh, Tabuk, Taif, Umluj, Wadi Al-Dawasir, White Volcano

Thailand: Krabi, Pattaya, Phuket

Turkey: Ankara, Antalya, Cappadocia, Istanbul, Izmir, Kuşadası, Pamukkale

United Arab Emirates: Abu Dhabi, Dubai, Fujairah, Ras Al Khaimeh, Sharjah

Europe
France: Paris

Greece: Athens, Crete, Santorini, Thessaloniki

Italy: Rome

Portugal: Lisbon

Spain: Barcelona, Seville 

United Kingdom: London

North America
Canada: Montreal 

Cuba: Havana

Mexico: Merida

References 

Internet properties established in 2019
Companies based in Amman
2019 establishments in Jordan